Glenn Caruso (born May 20, 1974) is an American football coach. He is the head football coach at the University of St. Thomas in Saint Paul, Minnesota, a position he had held since the 2008 season. Caruso served as the head football coach at Macalester College from 2006 to 2007. He has been awarded the Liberty Mutual Coach of the Year Award for NCAA Division III three times: 2010, 2011 and 2012.

Coaching career

In his first season at St. Thomas, in 2008, Caruso led the Tommies to a 7–3 record after the team had finished 2–8 the previous year.

After guiding the 2015 Tommies to the NCAA Division III Football Championship Game with a 14–1 record, Caruso was voted by his peers as the Division III National Coach of the Year by the American Football Coaches Association (AFCA). It was Caruso's 6th national coach of the year award, the most of any active NCAA Division III football coach.

During 2021 Caruso led St. Thomas' unprecedented leap from Division III to Division I.  In the school's first year at Division I, St. Thomas posted a 7–3 record and finished 3rd in the Pioneer League.  In 2022, the 2nd season of being a Division 1 program, 17 months into the transition, Caruso led St. Thomas to an undefeated conference championship, the university's first ever in any sport in its Division 1 era.

Head coaching record

References

External links
 St. Thomas profile

1974 births
Living people
American football centers
Ithaca Bombers football coaches
Ithaca Bombers football players
Macalester Scots football coaches
North Dakota State Bison football coaches
South Dakota Coyotes football coaches
St. Thomas (Minnesota) Tommies football coaches
Wisconsin–Eau Claire Blugolds football coaches
North Dakota State University alumni
Sportspeople from Greenwich, Connecticut